Bromus riparius is a species of grass in the family Poaceae.

Its native range is Northern Italy to Caucasus, China.

References

riparius